South Run may refer to:

South Run (Bowman Creek), a tributary of Bowman Creek in Wyoming County, Pennsylvania
South Run, Virginia, a census-designated place in Fairfax County